Federica Biscia (born 26 June 1980) is an Italian former breaststroke and medley swimmer who competed in the 2000 Summer Olympics.

References

1980 births
Living people
Italian female breaststroke swimmers
Italian female medley swimmers
Italian female freestyle swimmers
Olympic swimmers of Italy
Swimmers at the 2000 Summer Olympics
Universiade medalists in swimming
Mediterranean Games gold medalists for Italy
Mediterranean Games medalists in swimming
Swimmers at the 2001 Mediterranean Games
Universiade gold medalists for Italy
Medalists at the 2001 Summer Universiade
20th-century Italian women
21st-century Italian women